Tāwharanui Marine Reserve is a marine reserve covering an area of  in the Hauraki Gulf, offshore from the Tāwharanui Peninsula in the Auckland Region of New Zealand's North Island. It was established in 2011 and is administered by the Department of Conservation.

Geography

The reserve covers the area from Mean High Water Mark out to half a nautical mile into the sea, along three kilometres of the coastline.

The coastline contains a range of subtidal habitats, including reefs with overhangs, tunnels and caves. About 50 species of fish have been recorded, including schools of red moki, blue maomao, spotty, red mullet and koheru. There is a thriving population of lobster. Cetaceans such as bottlenose dolphin and orca also visit the waters nearby.

The main geological features of the reserve are exposed greywacke, large grey-green rocks formed during the Jurassic Period studded with marine fossils.

History

Both the Tāwharanui Peninsula and offshore sea area were sources of food and other resources for Māori hapū until well into the 20th century. There is archaeological evidence on the peninsula of shell middens, snapper and other fish bones, and 18 species of shellfish. There is also evidence of nine ships wrecked along the coastline.

Tāwharanui Marine Park was established in 1981 as New Zealand's first Marine Protected Area.

The marine park was replaced by the larger Tāwharanui Marine Reserve in September 2011. According to a New Zealand Treasury report, the new reserve, which covered a more clearly defined area that was  larger, would provide greater ecological benefits and potentially greater economic benefit.

Monitoring between 1977 and 2020 showed there were more crayfish within the reserve than outside it, but crayfish numbers within the protected area were still declining.

Recreation

The reserve includes lined with pōhutukawa, with rockpools swimming, surfing and camping areas. Boating is permitted, but boats and jetskis must not exceed five knots within 200 metres of the mainland or a dive flag, or within 50 metres of a boat or person in the water. Care must also be taken when anchoring to avoid damaging the sea 

The reserve is one of four places in New Zealand where people can snorkel to see abundant crayfish.

There is a ban on fishing, taking or killing marine life, and moving or removing any marine life or materials. People must not feed fish as it disturbs their natural behaviour, and they floor. Dogs are also not permitted at any time, and there is a complete fire ban.

See also

 Marine reserves of New Zealand

References

Marine reserves of New Zealand
Protected areas of the Auckland Region
Rodney Local Board Area
2011 establishments in New Zealand
Protected areas established in 2011